Amata chariessa is a moth of the subfamily Arctiinae. It was described by Karl Jordan in 1936. It is found in Zambia.

References

 

Endemic fauna of Zambia
chariessa
Moths described in 1936
Moths of Africa